KFND-LP (97.1 FM) is a radio station broadcasting a religious music format. Licensed to Rapid City, South Dakota, United States, the station is currently owned by Calvary Chapel of the Black Hills.

References

External links
 

FND-LP
Radio stations established in 2006
2006 establishments in South Dakota
FND-LP
Radio stations in Rapid City, South Dakota
Calvary Chapel Association